The Walt Disney Company, one of the largest media corporations in the world, has been the subject of a wide variety of criticisms of its business practices, executives, and content. Walt Disney Studios has been criticized for including stereotypical portrayal of non-white characters, sexism, and alleged plagiarism. Some of Disney's various business ventures, which include television networks, theme parks, and product lines, have also sparked controversy amongst groups of consumers and media outlets.

Company officials

Michael Eisner

In 1977, Roy E. Disney, the son of Disney co-founder Roy O. Disney and nephew of Walt Disney, resigned as an executive due to disagreements with his colleagues' decisions at the time. As he claimed later, "I just felt creatively the company was not going anywhere interesting. It was very stifling." However, he retained a seat on the board of directors. His resignation from the board in 1984, which occurred in the midst of a corporate takeover battle, was the beginning of a series of developments that led to the replacement of company president and CEO Ronald William Miller (married to Walt's daughter Diane Marie Disney) by Michael Eisner, Frank Wells, & Jeffrey Katzenberg. Roy soon returned to the company as vice-chairman of the board of directors and head of the animation department.

Michael Eisner has been criticized for his management style. The book DisneyWar by James B. Stewart is an exposé of Eisner's 20-year tenure as chairman and CEO at The Walt Disney Company. Stewart describes some of the following:
 The struggle to get Who Framed Roger Rabbit made in time and on budget despite the ambitions of Robert Zemeckis and Richard Williams to make the film bigger and bolder
 Eisner's tension with Frank Wells before Wells' death
 Eisner's friendship-turned-rivalry with Jeffrey Katzenberg
 Eisner's tension with Michael Ovitz during Ovitz's short-lived presidency
 The purchase of the ABC Family channel and its content and the fallout resulting from Disney's inability to revive it
 Hilary Duff's decision to quit the Disney Channel because of low salary
 Financing of the film Fahrenheit 9/11
 Pixar's decision not to renew its relationship with Disney
 The hostile takeover attempt by Comcast.

In 2003, Roy resigned from his positions as Disney vice chairman and chairman of Walt Disney Feature Animation, accusing Eisner of micromanagement, flops with the ABC television network, timidity in the theme park business, turning The Walt Disney Company into a "rapacious, soul-less" company, and refusing to establish a clear succession plan, as well as a string of box-office movie flops starting in the year 2000.

On March 3, 2004, at Disney's annual shareholders' meeting, a surprising 43% of Disney's shareholders, predominantly rallied by former board members Roy Disney and Stanley Gold, withheld their proxies to re-elect Eisner to the board. Disney's board then gave the chairmanship position to George J. Mitchell. However, the board did not immediately remove Eisner as chief executive.

On March 13, 2005, Eisner announced that he would step down as CEO one year before his contract expired. On September 30, Eisner resigned both as an executive and as a member of the board of directors, and, severing all formal ties with the company, he waived his contractual rights to perks such as the use of a corporate jet and an office at the company's Burbank headquarters. Eisner's replacement was his longtime assistant, Robert Iger.

Walt Disney Studios

Walt Disney Animation Studios

Ethnic and racial stereotyping
Over the years many scholars, film critics, and parent groups have been critical of Disney for the stereotypical portrayal of non-white characters. Examples cited included the short Mickey's Mellerdrammer where Mickey Mouse dresses in blackface; the stereotypical "Black" Bird in the short Who Killed Cock Robin?; Sunflower the half-zebra/half-African servant centaurette in Fantasia; the film Song of the South, which depicts an idealized version of the lives of former slaves; the depiction of Native American 'Indians' as savages in Peter Pan; the cunning and manipulative Siamese cats Si and Am in Lady and the Tramp; and the jive talking crows in Dumbo (however in the latter instance some critics have defended the crows as being one of the few characters in the film sympathetic to Dumbo's plight since being a marginalized group they understand what it's like to be ostracized themselves).

Some people have used these stereotypes to accuse Walt Disney of being racist. During a story meeting on Snow White and the Seven Dwarfs, he referred to the scene when the dwarfs pile on top of each other as a "nigger pile" and during casting of Song of the South he used the term pickaninny. However, Disney biography Gabler argues that "Walt Disney was no racist. He never, either publicly or privately, made disparaging remarks about blacks or asserted white superiority. Like most white Americans of his generation, however, he was racially insensitive." The feature film Song of the South was criticized by contemporary film critics, the National Association for the Advancement of Colored People, and others for its perpetuation of black stereotypes, but Disney became close friends with its star, James Baskett, describing him as "the best actor, I believe, to be discovered in years." Disney later campaigned successfully for Baskett to receive an Honorary Academy Award for his performance, the first black male actor so honored. Baskett died shortly afterward, and his widow wrote Disney a letter of gratitude for his support. Floyd Norman, the studio's first black animator who worked closely with Disney during the 1950s and 1960s, said, "Not once did I observe a hint of the racist behavior Walt Disney was often accused of after his death. His treatment of peopleand by this I mean all peoplecan only be called exemplary."

Since its release in 1992, Disney's Aladdin has been accused of perpetuating racial and ethnic stereotypes of Arabs. In July 1993, Disney announced that it would alter a line in the film's opening song, "Arabian Nights", written by Howard Ashman and Alan Menken. In the original film, the song featured the lyrics, "Where they cut off your ear if they don't like your face/It's barbaric, but hey, it's home." After Arab-American groups complained that the line was derogatory to Middle Easterners, Disney amended the lyrics in later editions of the film to an alternate lyric written by Ashman: "Where it's flat and immense and the heat is intense/It's barbaric, but hey, it's home." Menken approved the change before its adoption, as did the estate of Ashman, who had died before the film's completion. The American-Arab Anti-Discrimination Committee further requested that the word "barbaric" be removed; however, Disney refused this, claiming that the word appeared in all versions of Ashman's text and it referred to the film's desert setting in the altered lyrics. Don Bustany, president of the ADC's Los Angeles chapter, argued that the existing alterations were "nowhere near adequate, considering the racism depicted in Aladdin ... there still remains the very sleazy, burlesque character in the prologue and the scene where a merchant is going to cut off the hand of Princess Jasmine because she took an apple from his stand to give to a hungry child." A March 1995 article published on the ADC's website further criticized Aladdin for depicting the film's protagonists, Aladdin and Jasmine, with light skin and Anglicized features in contrast to dark-skinned merchants and palace guards who were cruel, greedy, and vicious while featuring Arab accents and distorted facial features. Shortly after the film's release, Jack Shaheen, a professor of mass communications at Southern Illinois University, said that "Aladdin is not an entertaining Arabian Nights fantasy as film critics would have us believe, but rather a painful reminder to 3 million Americans of Arab heritage, as well as 300 million Arabs and others, that the abhorrent Arab stereotype is as ubiquitous as Aladdin's lamp."

Sexism
In 1938, The Walt Disney Company sent a rejection letter to Mary Ford, stating that "girls are not considered" for creative positions. The letter was rediscovered in 2009 when Ford's grandson uploaded the image on Flickr. The letter received greater attention on January 7, 2014, when, after congratulating Emma Thompson for her Best Actress win at the National Board of Review Awards, Meryl Streep referenced the letter. Referencing Thompson's film, Saving Mr. Banks, Streep responded "It must have killed [Disney] to encounter a woman, an equally disdainful and superior creature, a person dismissive of his own considerable gifts and prodigious output and imagination."

In response to Streep's statements, many Disney scholars and artists defended Disney, including Disney Legend Floyd Norman, who said "Much has changed, and changed for the better." Other journalists found the speech ironic, noting that Streep just finished filming the then-upcoming Disney film, Into the Woods.

The Walt Disney Company has also been criticized for the lack of feminist values seen in the older, original Disney Princesses. Snow White in particular is under constant criticism for her lack of feminist ideals. The film Snow White and the Seven Dwarfs (1937) features a main protagonist who, at the time, fit the domestic and docile expectations of women in the pre-World War II era. Snow White is displayed on screen covered in a long dress, embellished with a white collar, puffy sleeves, red cape, and a red bow constraining her hair; a traditional, modest feminine look that reveals minimal skin. Through her actions portrayed in the movie, she draws on the traditional femininity that was encouraged in 1930s American culture. In the midst of the Great Depression, women were encouraged to return to the home and care for the household, a theme that is widely displayed in Snow White and the Seven Dwarfs.

However, with the second resurgence of Disney movies (known as the Disney Renaissance) beginning in 1989 and ending in 1999, Disney transformed the damsel in distress into a strong woman with a desire for adventure. This new approach ushered in a decade of go-getting, proactive heroines who possessed character traits that coincided with the new era of acceptable roles in a society where women hold the same jobs as men. This is evident in princesses such as Ariel from The Little Mermaid (1989), and Belle from Beauty and the Beast (1991).

Plagiarism
Several of Disney's animated feature films have been accused of plagiarizing existing works. The most notable and controversial example is The Lion King, which critics allege was plagiarized from Osamu Tezuka's Japanese manga ジャングル大帝 Janguru Taitei i.e. Jungle Emperor  and its anime adaptation of the same name (in Japan). This TV series was in turn dubbed and retitled Kimba the White Lion for English-speaking audiences by Titan Productions for NBC from 1965 to 1966, and it premiered on Los Angeles' KHJ-TV in September 1966. After Kimba's original run in the United States ended in the autumn of 1967, the series was shown in syndication on TV stations across the U.S. through September 30, 1978.

As a number of media journalists and fans watched The Lion King after its initial release in 1994, they noticed characters and events in the story resembling those of Kimba. Although the two works follow different screenplays, there are strong artistic similarities, and The Lion King contains numerous sequences that closely match up with Kimba. Other similarities are thematically deeper and more pronounced, such as that both feature the theme of the circle of life. Alleged similarities in the characters, beginning with the protagonist lion cubs Kimba and Simba, include the evil lions, the one-eyed Claw and Scar, the sage baboons Dan'l Baboon and Rafiki, the animated birds Pauley Cracker and Zazu, and the pair of hyena sidekicks (it was a trio in the Disney film).

The Lion King co-director Rob Minkoff deflected criticism of similarities in the characters by stating it was "not unusual to have characters like a baboon, a bird or hyenas" in films set in Africa. Both films feature the protagonist looking up at cloudbursts in the shape of his father lion, as pointed out by Frederick L. Schodt. The similarity is alluded to in a scene from The Simpsons episode 'Round Springfield", where a parody of Mufasa (voiced by Harry Shearer) in the clouds tells Lisa Simpson, "You must avenge my death, Kimba ... dah, I mean Simba!".

Matthew Broderick has said that when he was hired as the voice of adult Simba in The Lion King, he presumed the project was related to Kimba the White Lion. "I thought he meant Kimba, who was a white lion in a cartoon when I was a little kid", said Broderick. "So I kept telling everybody I was going to play Kimba. I didn't really know anything about it, but I didn't really care." In addition, a memo written by Roy E. Disney in July 1993 refers to Simba as "Kimba", causing critics to claim that Disney was aware of the similarities.

Upon the release of The Lion King in Japan, multiple Japanese cartoonists including Machiko Satonaka signed a letter urging the Walt Disney Company acknowledge due credit to Jungle Emperor Leo in the making of The Lion King. As Tim Hornyak wrote in The Japan Times, "The Tezuka–Disney connection extends back decades before the movie. Tezuka met Walt Disney at the 1964 New York World's Fair, and Disney said he hoped to "make something just like" Tezuka's Astro Boy.The Lion King director Roger Allers claimed he remained unfamiliar with Kimba throughout production until his movie was nearly completed; co-director Rob Minkoff also said he was unfamiliar with Kimba.

The other Disney film, Atlantis: The Lost Empire (2001), was alleged for plagiarizing the Japanese animated series as well; many critics and viewers alike claimed it was plagiarized from one of the popular anime television shows ふしぎの海のナディア Fushigi no Umi no Nadia i.e. Nadia of the Mysterious Seas (Nadia: The Secret of Blue Water) , more specifically in its character designs, setting and storyline. As noted by the viewers in Japan and America, the similarities became strong enough to call its production company Gainax to sue for plagiarism. They only refrained from doing so, according to Gainax member Yasuhiro Takeda, because the decision belonged to parent companies NHK and Toho. Hiroyuki Yamaga, another Gainax worker, was quoted in an interview in 2000 as: "We actually tried to get NHK to pick a fight with Disney, but even the National Television Network of Japan didn't dare to mess with Disney and their lawyers. ... We actually did say that but we wouldn't actually take them to court. We would be so terrified about what they would do to them in return that we wouldn't dare."

Although Disney never responded formally to those claims, co-director Kirk Wise posted on a Disney animation newsgroup in May 2001, "Never heard of Nadia till it was mentioned in this [newsgroup]. Long after we'd finished production, I might add." He claimed both Atlantis and Nadia were inspired, in part, by Jules Verne's 1870 novel Twenty Thousand Leagues Under the Seas. Speaking about the clarification, however, Lee Zion of Anime News Network wrote, "There are too many similarities not connected with 20,000 Leagues for the whole thing to be coincidence." As such, the whole affair ultimately entered popular culture as a convincing case of plagiarism. In 2018, Reuben Baron of Comic Book Resources added to Zion's comment stating, "Verne didn't specifically imagine magic crystal-based technology, something featured in both the Disney movie and the two similar anime. The Verne inspiration also doesn't explain the designs being suspiciously similar to Nadia."

In March 2014, animator Kelly Wilson sued Disney for plagiarism, alleging that the teaser trailer for Frozen was similar to her short film The Snowman. After four months of legal battling, federal judge Vince Chhabria ruled in Wilson's favor, citing evidence that Disney was aware of The Snowman and "the sequence of both works, from start to finish, is too parallel to conclude that no reasonable juror could find the works substantially similar." In April 2015, Chhabria explained that several Pixar employees had attended the 2011 San Francisco International Film Festival, in which The Snowman was screened four times alongside the Pixar short Play by Play. In June 2015, Entertainment Weekly reported that Disney had agreed to settle the case.

In March 2017, a year after the release of Disney's animated film Zootopia, screenwriter and producer Gary Goldman sued Disney, claiming that he had pitched a similar idea to the studio in 2000 and again in 2009. According to a story in The Hollywood Reporter, Goldman alleged that Disney had stolen the film's title and various artwork from him after he offered the project. A Disney spokesperson dismissed the accusations, declaring that "Mr. Goldman's lawsuit is riddled with patently false allegations. It is an unprincipled attempt to lay claim to a successful film he didn't create, and we will vigorously defend against it in court."

LGBT references in Disney films

Disney has been criticized for limiting and stereotyping LGBT representation in its media, with LGBT topics previously being deemed not "family-friendly" to address directly by Disney while villains were often portrayed as queer-coded through gender non-conformance.

Controversy was stirred in the live-action remake Beauty and the Beast (2017), when director Bill Condon announced that Lefou would come out as a gay character and dance with a man named Stanley. As a result, a theater in Henagar, Alabama refused to screen the film.

In March 2020, the Pixar animated film Onward introduced the first openly lesbian character in Disney media named Officer Specter, voiced by the real-life lesbian actress Lena Waithe, who discusses that her girlfriend's daughter gets her pulling her hair out. This resulted to the film receiving backlash in several Middle Eastern countries such as Kuwait, Oman, Qatar and Saudi Arabia. The film is also censored in Russia, where the gay propaganda law officially criminalizes the dissemination of LGBT-related content to children under 18.

Pixar's relationship with Disney
Pixar and Disney had disagreements after the production of Toy Story 2. Originally intended as a straight-to-video release (and thus not part of Pixar's five-picture deal), the film was eventually upgraded to a theatrical release during production. Pixar demanded that the film then be counted toward the five-picture agreement, but Disney refused. Pixar's first five feature films had collectively grossed more than $2.5 billion, equivalent to the highest per-film average gross in the industry. Though profitable for both, Pixar later complained that the arrangement was not equitable. Pixar was responsible for creation and production, while Disney handled marketing and distribution. Profits and production costs were split 50-50, but Disney exclusively owned all story and sequel rights and also collected a distribution fee. The lack of story and sequel rights was perhaps the most onerous aspect to Pixar and set the stage for a contentious relationship.

The two companies attempted to reach a new agreement in early 2004. The new deal would be only for distribution, as Pixar intended to control production and own the resulting film properties themselves. The company also wanted to finance their films on their own and collect 100 percent of the profits, paying Disney only the 10 to 15 percent distribution fee. More importantly, as part of any distribution agreement with Disney, Pixar demanded control over films already in production under their old agreement, including The Incredibles and Cars. Disney considered these conditions unacceptable, but Pixar would not concede.

Disagreements between Steve Jobs and then-Disney Chairman and CEO Michael Eisner made the negotiations more difficult than they otherwise might have been. They broke down completely in mid-2004, with Jobs declaring that Pixar was actively seeking partners other than Disney. Pixar did not enter negotiations with other distributors. After a lengthy hiatus, negotiations between the two companies resumed following the departure of Eisner from Disney in September 2005. In preparation for potential fallout between Pixar and Disney, Jobs announced in late 2004 that Pixar would no longer release movies at the Disney-dictated November time frame, but during the more lucrative early summer months. This would also allow Pixar to release DVDs during the Christmas shopping season. An added benefit of delaying Cars was to extend the time frame remaining on the Pixar-Disney contract to see how things would play out between the two companies.

Pending the Disney acquisition of Pixar in 2006, the two companies created a distribution deal for the intended 2007 release of Ratatouille, in case the acquisition fell through, to ensure that this one film would still be released through Disney's distribution channels (in contrast to the earlier Pixar deal, Ratatouille was to remain a Pixar property and Disney would have received only a distribution fee). The completion of Disney's Pixar acquisition, however, nullified this distribution arrangement.

Miramax and its handling of foreign films
Formerly a subsidiary of Disney from 1993 to 2010, Miramax has come under criticism for its editing, dubbing, and replacing the soundtracks of various foreign films that it releases. One notable example is Iron Monkey which, though released subtitled, had its subtitles altered to remove the political context of the story; had scenes trimmed and changed for violence and pacing; and had the soundtrack changed, removing the famous Wong Fei Hung theme. Other films that they have altered in this way include Shaolin Soccer; Farewell My Concubine (theatrical release); The Thief and the Cobbler; and Jet Li's Fist of Legend.

Peter Biskind's book Down and Dirty Pictures details many of the Weinsteins' dishonest dealings with filmmakers.

Under the Weinsteins, Miramax had a history of buying the rights to Asian films, only to sit on them without releasing them for years. One example of this is Hero, a 2002 Chinese martial arts film. It languished in Miramax's vaults for two years before it was salvaged with the intervention of Quentin Tarantino. Another example is Tears of the Black Tiger, a Thai film originally released in 2000. After changing the film's ending, Tears of the Black Tiger sat in Miramax's vaults for five years until its rights were purchased by Magnolia Pictures in 2006.

A "no cuts" policy was highlighted when Miramax co-chairman Harvey Weinstein demanded edits to the Japanese anime film Princess Mononoke to make it more marketable. In response, Toshio Suzuki, a producer at Studio Ghibli, sent an authentic katana with a simple message: "No cuts". According to promotion manager Steve Alpert, when Weinstein initially found out about this, he flew into a rage, threatening Alpert that he would "never work in this ... industry again". He eventually gave in, however, and the film was released uncut.

One reason for the delays and non-releases of films was an accounting scheme that the Weinsteins used to shift potential money-losing films to future fiscal years and ensure they would receive annual bonuses from Disney, while trying to bar retailers from legally exporting authentic DVDs of the films.

Defenders of the company point out that, prior to Miramax, most of the films purchased by the company would have had little to no chance of achieving U.S. distribution other than by very small distributors with minimal marketing expertise and funds. They also state that the purpose of the company's aggressive re-editing technique was always to try to help the films find a broader American audience than they might otherwise find. "I'm not cutting for fun", Harvey Weinstein said in an interview, "I'm cutting for the shit to work. All my life I served one master: the film. I love movies."

Miramax is also accused of ignoring their more artistic, less audience-friendly films, especially when directors refuse to re-cut them to make them less challenging. Dead Man, which director Jim Jarmusch refused to re-cut, got a very limited release and critics have accused the Weinsteins of burying the film.

Miramax was parodied in the Kevin Smith film Jay and Silent Bob Strike Back (2001), in which the studio attempted to adapt Jay and Silent Bob's comic book characters, Bluntman and Chronic, into a movie, thus resulting in the duo traveling to Hollywood to stop them from making the movie. According to Kevin Smith, this film is a direct response to the controversy surrounding his previous film Dogma.

Walt Disney Television

American Broadcasting Company
On February 9, 1996, The Walt Disney Company acquired Capital Cities/ABC, and renamed the broadcasting group ABC, Inc., although the network also continues to use American Broadcasting Companies, such as on TV productions it owns.

ABC's relationship with Disney dates back to 1953 when Leonard Goldenson pledged enough money so that the "Disneyland" theme park could be completed. ABC continued to hold Disney notes and stock until 1960, and also had first call on the "Disneyland" television series in 1954.

With this new relationship came an attempt at cross-promotion, with attractions based on ABC, shows at Disney parks and an annual soap festival at Walt Disney World (the former president of ABC, Inc., Robert Iger, now heads Disney). In 1997, ABC aired a Saturday morning block called One Saturday Morning, which changed to ABC Kids in 2002. It featured a five-hour line-up of children's shows (mostly cartoons) for children ages 5–12, but it was changed to a four-hour line-up in 2005. Since then, it was aimed for children more in the 10–16 age range.

Despite intense micro-managing on the part of Disney management, the flagship television network was slow to turn around. In 1999, the network was able to experience a brief bolster in ratings with the hit game show Who Wants to Be a Millionaire. A new national phenomenon, Survivor, on CBS persuaded the schedulers at ABC to change Millionaire slot over to the Wednesday time slot at 8:00 to kill Survivor before it got ratings to hold. The first results were promising for CBS; they lost by only a few rating points. ABC tried to keep the strength running, so they tried an unprecedented strategy for Millionaire by airing the show four times a week during the next fall season, in the process overexposing the show, as it appeared on the network sometimes five or six nights during a week.

ABC's ratings fell dramatically as competitors introduced their own game shows and the public grew tired of the format. Alex Wallau took over as president in 2000. Despite the repeated overexposure of Millionaire and its switch to syndication, ABC continued to find some success in dramas such as The Practice (which gave birth to a successful spinoff, Boston Legal, in 2004); Alias; and Once and Again. ABC also had some moderately successful comedies including The Drew Carey Show; Spin City; Dharma & Greg; According to Jim; My Wife and Kids; and George Lopez.

Still, one asset that ABC lacked in the early 2000s that most other networks had was popularity in reality television. ABC's briefly-lived reality shows Are You Hot? and I'm a Celebrity... Get Me Out of Here! proved to be an embarrassment for the network. By the end of the 2003–2004 television season, ABC slumped to fourth place, becoming the first of the original "Big Three" networks to fall into such ratings.

ABC Daytime

 When Megan McTavish returned as head writer of All My Children in July 2003, she faced criticism for a story that depicted the rape of a lesbian character, Bianca Montgomery. The show also faced opposition to its story of a transgender character in 2006.
 ABC Daytime scrapped a One Life to Live storyline which was to depict a school shooting rampage on the day the Virginia Tech massacre occurred on April 16, 2007.
 The Writers Guild of America East filed arbitration suits against ABC Daytime, claiming that they violated the strike-termination agreement by retaining replacement writers (those who choose Financial Core Status) who filled in during the strike on All My Children instead of bringing back the writers who had been on strike.
 The ABC Network as a whole has been criticized for the cancellations of both One Life to Live and All My Children as well as the near-cancellation of its one remaining soap opera General Hospital.

"The strike-termination agreement does not allow the retention of replacement writers in lieu of allowing striking writers to return to their jobs. ABC Daytime are clearly violating this agreement", said Ira Cure, senior counsel for the WGA East, in a statement. "They have left us no other option but to file arbitrations to ensure that our members will be afforded their rights outlined under this agreement." Broadcasting & Cable: Arbitration Suit Against ABC-D
 In December 2008, Soap Opera Weekly/Soap Opera Digest critic Marlena De Lacroix called ABC Daytime a "chauvinistic hellhole".

In August 2009, Frons announced that the production of All My Children would move from New York City to Los Angeles by the end of the year.

ABC News

On April 30, 2004, Nightline host Ted Koppel read the names of the members of the United States Armed Forces who were killed in Iraq. This prompted controversy from conservatives, who believed that Koppel was making a political statement, and from Sinclair Broadcasting Group, which felt that ABC was undermining the Iraq war effort. Others, including a The Washington Post television columnist, thought it was a ratings stunt for sweeps, and indeed Nightline was the highest-rated program during that time period, and had about 30% more viewers than other Nightline programs that week. Sinclair stations did not air the program.

Koppel repeated the format on May 28, 2004, reading the names of service members killed in Afghanistan, and on May 30, 2005, reading the names of all service members killed in Afghanistan or Iraq between the last program and the preparation of the program. This time, Sinclair stations aired the program as scheduled.

In the wake of the job cuts, a significant controversy erupted online in May 2010 after it was announced the former VP of news coverage, Mimi Gurbst, was leaving the network to become a guidance counselor. A story in the New York Observer reported that Gurbst was a "cherished" mentor inside the news division. Reporters who closely follow TV news observed that a large number of current and former ABC News staffers went online to vigorously respond that Gurbst had helped perpetuate a negative culture with ABC News.

The Path to 9/11

ABC aired the controversial two-part miniseries The Path to 9/11 in the US on September 10, 2006, at 8 p.m. EDT and September 11, 2006, at 8 p.m. EDT. The extensive pre-broadcast controversy over the film has included disputes over the accuracy of its dramatization of key events, as well as calls by historians and from former Clinton and Bush administration officials for ABC to re-edit part of the film or to not broadcast it at all. According to the official statement released by ABC on September 7, 2006, the film is a dramatization, not a documentary, drawn from a variety of sources, including The 9/11 Commission Report, other published materials, and personal interviews.

The main source of the controversy stems from portions of the film concerned with the Clinton administration in the 1990s. Critics say that certain dramatized scenes tend to suggest that blame for the events that took place on September 11, 2001, lies with Clinton and his cabinet. One example cited is a scene in which then-National Security Advisor Sandy Berger does not approve of the order to take out a surrounded Osama bin Laden, tells the squad in Afghanistan that they will have to do the job without official authorization and then hangs up the phone. According to Sandy Berger and others – including conservative author and Clinton critic Richard Miniter – this never happened. Screenwriter Cyrus Nowrasteh has now admitted that the abrupt hang-up was not in the script and was improvised.

American Airlines reportedly threatened to pull its advertising from ABC after this program aired. The liberal watchdog group Media Matters for America named ABC its third annual "Misinformer of the Year" award in 2006, not only for the miniseries, but for the alleged conservative pandering of ABC News director Mark Halperin and for biased claims on news programs such as ABC World News and Good Morning America.

Alexis Debat
Alexis Debat, a consultant for ABC for years and also a writer for The National Interest, resigned from ABC in June 2007 after the broadcasting company discovered that he did not have a Ph.D. from the Sorbonne as he pretended. Furthermore, in September 2007, the French news media Rue 89 revealed that he had made at least two bogus interviews, one of Barack Obama and another of Alan Greenspan, both published in the French magazine Politique internationale. This in turn also led to his resignation from The National Interest. Debat had specialized in reports on terrorism and national security for the past six years (writing, for example, on the Jundallah Balochi and Sunni organization).

ABC contract dispute affecting WABC-TV and WPVI
On March 2, 2010, WABC-TV in New York, along with Philadelphia sister station WPVI (carried in Mercer, Monmouth, and Ocean counties), stated that they would pull their programming from Cablevision on March 7, 2010 (at midnight), unless a new payment structure was implemented for its network programming. Cablevision responded by citing WABC-TV and WPVI's free, over-the-air accessibility. Cablevision spokesman Charles Schueler stated, "It is not fair for ABC-Disney to hold Cablevision customers hostage by forcing them to pay what amounts to a new TV tax."

The removal of both stations occurred on the weekend of the 82nd Academy Awards, which was scheduled to be one of ABC's largest yearly specials, and was projected to cause a devastating blow to advertisers for the Oscars and to Cablevision itself.

On Sunday, March 7, 2010, at 12:01 a.m. ET, both WABC and WPVI were removed from Cablevision, leaving a black screen in their place, confirming the rumors that if a deal with Cablevision and ABC was not reached by midnight, the network and other Disney-owned channels would go off the air.

Cablevision began looping a public service announcement on each affected channel and forcing all of its customers' set-top boxes to channel 1999, which was looping the same announcement, much like was done when Scripps Networks pulled their cable channels' programming. Besides providing certain details of the disagreement they stated that ABC shows could be watched online through TV websites such as Hulu.

Also that day, Cablevision announced through e-mail that their entire film catalog of on-demand movies would be available without charge until midnight that evening as an apology to their customers.

At 8:50 p.m. that day, WABC and WPVI returned to Cablevision's programming, after notification during the 82nd Academy Awards announced progression in "Work to complete our negotiations", and the return of ABC's programming during the negotiations.

Freeform
Fox Family Worldwide Inc. was sold from News Corporation's Fox Entertainment Group to Disney for $2.9 billion on October 24, 2001. The sale to Disney also included TV channel Fox Kids and Saban Entertainment (renamed BVS Entertainment (now Hasbro)). The entire network was officially renamed ABC Family on November 10, 2001.

The sale to Disney was considered one of the largest mistakes or problems occurring during the tenure of Michael Eisner. The failure was primarily due to the acquisition being done by the strategic planning department of Disney, without consulting anyone at ABC. The original plan was to use the channel to essentially show re-runs of ABC programming, but this plan was completely impossible since ABC had no syndication rights to the majority of their own programs. During this time, the network did air same-season repeats of Alias, Less Than Perfect, Life with Bonnie, and The Bachelor, almost all of which were Touchstone Television productions (The Bachelor is distributed by Time Warner's Telepictures). But in trying to change the focus of the channel, Disney also canceled several Fox Family series, like State of Grace, and cut back on the network's TV movies, which were among the few programs Fox Family was doing well with. The ratings tumbled further as the network became dependent on syndicated reruns and no original programs (save for original wrap-around segments around Bachelor repeats, and children's programming).

The next major plan was to reposition the channel to market it to college students, young women, or to a more hip audience under the name XYZ, a reverse reference to ABC. Disney soon found that the channel could never be renamed as such. The original sale from CBN to Fox/Saban contained a (now disputed) stipulation that the channel contains the word "Family" in the name forever, no matter who owns the network. To create XYZ, the Family Channel would have had to cease to exist – terminating all existing cable TV contracts – and XYZ would have to be created as a completely new network. Cable companies would not be obligated to put XYZ in the spot vacated by the Family Channel. ABC scrapped the idea after discovering this clause.

The name was revisited at one point in 2003, serving as a program block entitled "The XYZ", showing programs and movies aimed at the above groups. The network was also used as a buffer to burn off failed ABC series, such as All American Girl, which featured former Spice Girl Geri Halliwell.

Since 2006, the critics have gone after programming on ABC Family. Most critics of the network feel it has gone from a family friendly to "too risqué", and shows like Greek and The Secret Life of the American Teenager are far too racy for "family viewers". Critics feel that the executives at ABC Family are only after viewership numbers and are unconcerned about showing younger generations in questionable scenarios in series and films. The main focus of criticism is on teenage pregnancy or underage drinking.

Despite the channel's name including the word "Family", the channel's programming content standards had changed several years earlier after the sale of the channel by International Family Entertainment, and the channel had been airing even some acquired series and movies that contain profanity, violence and sexual content or dialogue after the sale, particularly since being purchased by The Walt Disney Company. ABC Family did air parental advisory tags at the beginning of some TV-14 rated programs, such as That '70s Show and some episodes of The Secret Life of the American Teenager.
In 2015, a survey revealed that viewers who only watched the channel occasionally thought that the channel was entirely family-friendly. As a result, the channel was rebranded as Freeform on January 12, 2016. This change was made in order to establish the network as a general entertainment channel. Despite this, family-oriented shows and movies continue to air on the network.

National Geographic Partners
The enterprise was originally established by 21st Century Fox and the National Geographic Society. Following the completion of Disney's acquisition of 21st Century Fox on March 20, 2019, Disney assumed 21CF's 73% share in the joint venture.

Disney Channel
Some critics disapprove of the Disney Channel marketing strategy led by Anne Sweeney, president of the Disney Channel from 1996 to 2014. Under Sweeney, the Disney Channel's programming was geared mainly towards preteen and teenage girls, with a decrease in animated programming. Criticism was also aimed at removing almost all Walt-era and pre-1990s material from the channel in 2002 with the removal of the late-night "Vault Disney" block devoted to this material, which used to make up the majority of the channel's programming since its inception in 1983. In 2008, Sweeney explained that Disney Channel, resulting from its multi-platform marketing strategy using television and music, would become "the major profit driver for the [Walt Disney] Company."

The channel has also pulled (and sometimes re-shot) episodes that have featured subject matter deemed inappropriate for its target audience, due either to humor or to timing of real-life events. 

 In November 2008, the episode "No Sugar, Sugar" (Hannah Montana), in which Mitchel Musso's character, Oliver Oken, is revealed to have Type 1 diabetes, was pulled before its broadcast, due to parent complaints about its portrayal of diabetics and sugar intake.

 In December 2011, Disney Channel pulled episodes of two of its original series, due to complaints on Twitter from Demi Lovato about their portrayal of eating disorders. Pulled episodes included "Party It Up" (Shake It Up) and "Colbie Caillat" (So Random!). 

 In May 2013, Disney Channel pulled "Quitting Cold Koala" (Jessie) due to parental concerns over a scene in which a character's gluten-free diet leads to ridicule.

ESPN

Criticism of ESPN is mostly concerning the journalistic standards of the network versus the entertainment division.

One such event came in 2010 when ESPN gave one hour of time, and the advertising money that goes with it, to NBA superstar LeBron James so he could announce where he would play during the 2010-11 NBA season. This program was called The Decision and received criticism because ESPN ceded control of the hour to an outside source, and the person doing the interview was Jim Gray, who was not an ESPN employee. This is in addition to the hours of hype preceding the special which was in the form of a three-hour SportsCenter telecast.

There was a Texas Tech scandal, which involved ESPN College Football analyst Craig James. Through James, ESPN used its power to get head coach Mike Leach fired because of how James's son, Adam, was treated following a concussion.

ESPN has also been accused of overpaying for sports broadcasting rights, and that Wall Street analysts have raised concerns that this could be a major drain on Disney as a whole, since the amount of money that can be recuperated from retransmission consent fees and advertising is limited; Disney still profits from the ESPN division but as of 2015 was cutting the network's higher-priced content to ensure long-term profitability. In October 2015, ESPN laid off about 300 employees, citing the rights costs combined with the increasing trend of cord-cutting.

In November 2019, ESPN's owner The Walt Disney Company launched the streaming service called Disney+. ESPN heavily promoted the Disney+ launch, leading to accusations that the network was sacrificing its journalistic integrity. Examples cited by critics included a Simpsons-themed edition of SportsCenter "Top 10", as well as NFL reporter Adam Schefter tweeting that Disney+ "will change lives". Writing in Slate, Laura Wagner said that the "tongue bath" for Disney+ "represents a new inflection point in ESPN's decline from journalistic institution to entertainment company". Wagner added "This clumsy marketing blitz is an embarrassing exercise that turns ostensible reporters into stooges. It's also a stark example of just how flimsy ESPN's editorial vision has become." Meanwhile, Kelly McBride of the nonprofit journalism organization the Poynter Institute in an interview with The Washington Post said "You're turning the journalist into a salesperson and asking them to upsell the product. That's not the relationship you want the journalist to have with the audience member. You want that relationship to be about trust in the journalist's expertise."

Disney Media and Entertainment Distribution

Hulu

Kim Kardashian-Roblox scandal
The series premiere of The Kardashians, which debuted on April 14, 2022, titled "Burn Them All to the F*cking Ground", led to a public feud between Kim Kardashian and Roblox. In the episode, Kim's son Saint West shows his mother an experience on the platform from a tablet that depicts an image of Kim crying across skybox and baseplate. She claimed, however, that the person who uploaded the experience had also obtained footage of her and Ray J's sex tape, and that she reacted by crying and claiming to later sue the company. Despite this allegation, the incident has been seen by many as a hoax, and was deceptively edited and staged as a way to cause uproar and false drama.

A spokesperson for Roblox responded by saying "The referenced video was never available on our platform. We have strict moderation and policies to protect our community, including zero tolerance for sexual content of any kind which violates our community rules." and "The text reference to the tape that got around our filters was quickly taken down and fortunately visible only to an extremely small number of people on the platform. We also swiftly took down the associated experience and banned the community developer involved with the incident." An individual close to the Kardashian family denied accusations of faking the event.

The series is distributed by Disney Platform Distribution and was released in the United States on Hulu, Disney+ internationally via Star and Star+ in Latin America.

Walt Disney Parks and Resorts

Disneyland Resort

Ban on same-sex dancing
Between 1957, when the park first allowed dancing, and 1989, Disneyland only allowed pairs of men and women to dance on stage, barring single and group dancers (with the exception of children) as well as same-sex couples. Disney claimed the policy had been put in place for crowd control and to avoid harassment of women, but also stated that it was "because some patrons might have found dance partners of the same sex offensive". Teenage gay rights activist Andrew Exler (now known as Crusader) decided to dance with his friend Shawn Elliott in 1980 to protest the policy after his lesbian roommate was told she couldn't dance with other girls; the security guards responded to their "homosexual fast-dancing" by kicking them out, claiming that as a "family park... We do not put up with alternative lifestyles here." Exeler, who had already notified the media, sued Disney in court for discrimination and won the suit in 1984; however, Disney later claimed that the ruling only applied to Exler and Elliott and continued to enforce the ban, particularly for same-sex "slow" or "touch" dancing, resulting in another lawsuit later in the decade that forced Disney to rescind the policy in 1989.

Al Lutz's Disneyland reports
Al Lutz, who has written about Disney since the 1990s, often writes about a perceived decline in value and quality at Disney's theme parks, chiefly Disneyland and its neighboring park Disney California Adventure that opened in 2001. Much of his criticism was directed at Paul Pressler, the one-time president of Disneyland who later was named chairman of Walt Disney Parks and Resorts, and Cynthia Harriss, Pressler's successor as Disneyland's president. From 1996–2002, Lutz maintained a set of sarcastic Web pages called Promote Paul Pressler!, with the stated goal of "getting current Disneyland Resort President Paul Pressler promoted to a new job somewhere else within The Walt Disney Company!"

Lutz's July 2006 report on the alleged antics of Lindsay Lohan during a private party held at Disneyland for her 20th birthday drew a rebuke from a representative for the actress, who said that reports of bad behavior were "complete bull". This report brought Lutz's website, MiceAge, briefly into the spotlight, and established Lutz as a Disney watchdog in the mainstream media.

In late 2007, mainstream media outlets including The New York Times; the Los Angeles Times; the Associated Press; and foreign newspapers referenced claims made in two of Lutz's columns. One was about a planned refurbishment of the "it's a small world" attraction at Disneyland that would modify the ride's boat and flume trough to accommodate boats capable of carrying heavier park guests, a claim that Disney has consistently denied in subsequent media coverage.

Disney California Adventure
Disney California Adventure, originally named Disney's California Adventure Park until a name change in June 2010, was expected to draw large crowds when it opened in 2001. A January 14, 2001 Los Angeles Times article titled "The most Jam-Packed Theme Park on Earth?" stated "Senior Disney officials acknowledge that there will be days when California Adventure will have to turn patrons away, particularly in the first weeks after the park opens, during spring break and again in the summer." The actual attendance was not close to the size that Disney expected for the park back in 2001.

The reasons for this has been speculated as:
 Bad word-of-mouth from early visitors discouraged future visitors, stating the park was lacking in Disney-quality attractions.
 Hollywood Pictures Backlot had a lack of focus on the restaurants, shops, and attractions.
 Lack of rides for young children.
 The park's Californian theme was criticized as being redundant, seeing as the park itself was located in the same state that it represented. Various tourist attractions and landmarks such as the Hollywood Sign and the beaches were located less than an hour away from the park.
 Fans criticized the Paradise Pier area of the park because many of the attractions in this area were generic rides that guests do not expect to find at a Disney park. This was ironic because Walt Disney originally created the neighboring Disneyland to provide a theme park experience unlike boardwalk piers and amusement parks of the era, and instead wanted to create a park where the entire family could enjoy themselves.
 With an estimated price tag of $600 million, the park was criticized for being built "on the cheap", with a small number of attractions and minimal theming.
 Many guests complained that a single day admission ticket to Disney's California Adventure cost the same as a single day admission ticket to Disneyland, yet contained fewer attractions, shows, and entertainment.

Disney's chief executive officer, Robert Iger, went on record during the company's annual stockholder meeting on March 10, 2006, when someone asked about a potential third park being built in Anaheim. "We're still working to assure the second gate is successful", Iger said, referring to California Adventure. "In the spirit of candor, we have been challenged."

On October 17, 2007, The Walt Disney Company announced a multi-year, $1.1 billion expansion plan for Disney's California Adventure Park. Plans for the renovation and expansion were put on display for park visitors inside the Blue Sky Cellar at the Golden Vine Winery. Disney listened to the public and several of the attractions which drew criticism from the public were removed in the multi-year, multibillion-dollar redesign and expansion of Disney's California Adventure. Other rides were redesigned or replaced with a larger focus on Disney characters and stories.

On May 28, 2010, it was announced through the Disney Parks Blog that the park would also be receiving a name change, to Disney California Adventure, as well as a new logo. The new name took effect on June 11, 2010, appearing on park maps and banners, but it was first used in a commercial promoting Disney's World of Color a few days prior. World of Color premiered on June 11, 2010, as part of Disney's Summer Nighttastic.

Walt Disney World Resort

Disney's Animal Kingdom

Even in the planning stages, various Florida based animal rights groups and PETA did not like the idea of Disney creating a theme park where animals were held in captivity. The groups protested, and PETA tried to convince travel agents not to book trips to the park. A few weeks before the park opened, a number of animals died due to accidents. The United States Department of Agriculture viewed most of the cases and found no violations of animal-welfare regulations. On opening day, the Orange County Sheriff's office sent about 150 deputies in fear that there might be a large protest, but only 24 protesters showed up. The protest lasted two hours, and there were no arrests.

One year after the park opened, The Animal Rights Foundation of Florida complained that a New Year's Eve fireworks show could upset the animals. A USDA inspector came to the park to find no problems with launching low-noise fireworks half a mile away.

Disney's Wide World of Sports Complex

A former baseball umpire and an architect alleged that they approached The Walt Disney Company in 1987 with plans for a sports complex and that Wide World of Sports, which opened 10 years later, was heavily based on their designs. Disney claimed that, while the designs had some similarities, the complex was also similar to numerous other sporting facilities, and the concept of a sports park was too generic for any one group to claim ownership. The two men, represented in part by noted attorney Johnnie Cochran, sued Disney in Orange County civil court. In August 2000, a jury returned a verdict for the plaintiffs with damages in the amount of $240 million, a fraction of the $1.5 billion sought. Disney appealed the judgment, and settled out of court in September 2002 for undisclosed terms.

Walt Disney World College Program
The Walt Disney World College Program is a U.S. national internship program operated by The Walt Disney Company, located at the Walt Disney World Resort. The Walt Disney World College Program recruits students (18 years and older) and all majors for a semester-long paid internship program working at the Walt Disney World Resort.

Critics argue that Disney is using the program as a source of cheap labor, as interns do the same work as veteran employees, but at a significantly lower pay rate. In late 2007, a permanent Cast Member ran for president of the local union in Orlando. Part of his platform intended to get rid of the Disney College Program, claiming that the program "imports thousands of low-wage earners every year to work for Disney, depressing the local employment market and keeping wages down." Disney responded that the program is beneficial in the recruitment of cast members and that 8,000 workers out of 62,000 do not greatly impact operations. It has been criticized also for its lack of union representation and denial of insurance benefits by the company.

Miscellaneous 
In 2017, The Walt Disney Company and two of its subsidiaries reached an agreement with the U.S. Department of Labor to pay $3.8M to 16,339 employees of Walt Disney Parks and Resorts U.S. Inc and Disney Vacation Club Management Corp. After Disney had started charging employees for their costumes, the income of many employees fell below the federal minimum wage. The resorts were also found to be in violation of overtime and payroll recordkeeping regulations.

Disneyland Paris
In May 1992, entertainment magazine The Hollywood Reporter reported that about 25% of Euro Disney's workforce – approximately 3,000 men and women – had resigned their jobs due to unacceptable working conditions. It also reported that the park's attendance was far behind expectations. Euro Disney S.C.A., the company that operates Disneyland Paris, responded in an interview with The Wall Street Journal, in which the company's president, Robert Fitzpatrick, claimed that only 1,000 people had left their jobs.

In response to the financial situation, Fitzpatrick ordered that the Disney-MGM Studios Europe project would be put on hiatus until a further decision could be made. Prices at the resort's hotels were also reduced significantly.

Despite these efforts, in May 1992 daily park attendance was around 25,000 (some reports give a figure of 30,000) instead of the predicted 60,000. Euro Disney's stock price spiraled downwards and on July 23, 1992, the Resort announced an expected net loss in its first year of operation of approximately 300 million French francs. During Euro Disney's first winter, hotel occupancy was such that it was decided to close Disney's Newport Bay Club hotel for the season. Initial hopes were that each visitor would spend around US$33 per day, but near the end of 1992, analysts reckoned spending to be around 12% lower.

Efforts to improve attendance included serving alcoholic beverages with meals inside the Euro Disneyland theme park, in response to a presumed European demand, which began June 12, 1993.

In January 1994, Sanford Litvack, an attorney from New York City and former Assistant Attorney General during the Jimmy Carter presidency, was assigned to be Disney's lead negotiator regarding Euro Disney's future. On February 28, Litvack made an offer (without the consent of Eisner or Frank Wells) to split the debts between Euro Disney creditors and Disney. After the banks showed interest, Litvack informed Eisner and Wells. On March 14, the day before the annual shareholders meeting, the banks capitulated to Disney's demands. The creditor banks bought US$500 million worth of Euro Disney shares, forgave 18 months of interest and deferred interest payments for three years. The Walt Disney Company invested US$750 million into Euro Disney and granted a five-year suspension of royalty payments. In June that same year, Saudi Arabian Prince Al-Waleed Bin Talal Bin Abdulaziz Al Saud cut a deal whereby The Walt Disney Company bought 51% of a new US$1.1 billion share issue, the rest being offered to existing shareholders at below-market rates, with the Prince buying any that were not taken up by existing shareholders (up to a 24.5% holding).  Prince Al-Waleed Bin Talal was alleged to be a financier of Al Qaeda by The National Commission on Terrorist Attacks Upon the United States, also known as the 9/11 Commission.

Walt Disney Studios Park, which was built in a desperate and rushed attempt to increase the resort's attendance, was also criticized for its lackluster theming, lack of quality attractions and bland environment since its opening. It was also Disney's smallest and least attended theme park. Efforts made to improve the park included the addition of several new attractions, a new themed land Toy Story Playland and re-theming of other areas. One of the new attractions, Crush's Coaster, was also criticized for its long lines and wait times reaching up to two hours even on non-crowded days due to its popularity, despite being not capable of handling riders at a fast rate. About one hour before the official opening time of the park, guests were able to enter the park to wait in line for the ride, which had not been done before in any other Disney ride. Attempts to apply a Fastpass line in the ride have been proved to be more inefficient.

Hong Kong Disneyland Resort

Overcrowding problems
Just before the grand opening, the park was criticized for underestimating the daily capacity limit.  The problem became apparent on the charity preview day on September 4, 2005, when 30,000 locals visited the park. This event turned out to be a disaster, because there were too many guests for the park to accommodate. Wait times at fast food outlets were at least 45 minutes in length, and wait times at rides were two hours in length.

Although the community, and the park's biggest shareholder, the Hong Kong government, put pressure on the park to lower the capacity, the park insisted on keeping the limit and only agreed to relieve the capacity problem by extending the opening time by one hour or introducing more discounts during weekdays. However, the park said that local visitors tend to stay in the park for about nine hours per visit, implying that the mentioned practices would do little to solve the problem.

During the Chinese New Year 2006, many visitors arrived at the park in the morning bearing valid tickets but were refused entry, because the park was already at capacity. Disgruntled visitors attempted to force their way into the park or gain access by climbing over the barrier gates. Disneyland management was forced to revise their ticketing policy and designated future periods close to Chinese public holidays as 'special days' during which admission would only be allowed through a date-specific ticket.

Food safety panel
Officers from the Food and Environmental Hygiene Department, who were asked by Disney staff to take off their badges and caps in order to enter the park, left park visitors feeling very uneasy. The officers investigated a food-poisoning case in the park's restaurants. The chairman of Legco's food Safety panel, Fred Li, described the incident as shocking and called on the director of the department to take follow-up action against Disney. Hong Kong Disneyland says that what happened was inappropriate and has apologized for the incident. The Secretary for Justice has since said that the government did not have enough evidence to make a prosecution, thus dropping the case.

Fingerprinting
As at other Disney theme parks, visitors to Hong Kong Disneyland have their finger biometrics scanned at the entry gate. Visitors are not warned of the policy beforehand. Scanning is done of all visitors older than 10 years of age, and is used to associate ticket media with the person using it. The company claims that "the 50 sample points from the surface of a guest's finger ... do not contain sufficient information to recreate a fingerprint image." Nonetheless, forensic specialists note that the data collected are more than adequate to establish a positive identification.

Shark fin soup controversy
Disney originally planned to serve shark fin soup, a traditional Chinese delicacy, at wedding banquets. Animal rights groups protested in June 2005, citing the declining shark population in global waters and the cruel methods sometimes used of cutting the fin and discarding live sharks back into the sea.

At first, Disney removed shark fin soup from its menu, but said that it would still offer the soup if their clients insisted on having it served at their wedding. They said they would distribute leaflets about shark conservation in order to discourage the choice.

However, after constant and continuous pressure from both environmental groups and animal welfare groups, shareholders concerned about the company's image, Disney announced on June 24, 2005, that shark fin soup will not be served at all, because, according to their press release, "After careful consideration and a thorough review process, we were not able to identify an environmentally sustainable fishing source, leaving us no alternative except to remove shark fin soup from our wedding banquet menu".

Other controversies
Fish around Ma Wan died as a result of land reclamation.

Disney's PhotoPass
Disney's PhotoPass is a professional photography service offered at Disney theme parks, water parks, and resorts. Photographers positioned at locations in the theme parks, dining events at the resorts, and at the Bibbidi Bobbidi Boutique at Downtown Disney are linked to a free card containing a unique serial number. Guests can view or purchase PhotoPass pictures at locations in the parks (generally near the park entrance) or online by registering the card's number.

Customers have complained about the difference in advertised prices, particularly of Photo CD products, and the actual cost. Disney has responded that advertised specials apply only to products purchased at the parks and do not apply to the website.

Disney Consumer Products

Disney Princess
On December 24, 2006, Peggy Orenstein published "What's Wrong With Cinderella?" in The New York Times. In her article, Orenstein discussed her concerns about the effects of princess figures on young girls. Orenstein used the Disney Princesses specifically to present many of her points. Orenstein also noted the pervasive nature of princess-related merchandise and that every facet of play has its princess equivalent.

Other sources have also voiced concern that the franchise could possibly give young girls the wrong message. However, other parents who have young daughters say that they would eventually grow out of this phase.

Marvel Comics
Page 16 of Captain America #602 (March 2010) depicted an anti-tax protest march in Idaho in which one participant held a sign reading "Tea Bag the Libs Before They Tea Bag You", with a caption containing the words of an off-screen African-American superhero, the Falcon, telling Captain America, "I don't exactly see a black man from Harlem fitting in with a bunch of angry white folks." The cartoon drew the condemnation of Michael Johns, a board member of the Nationwide Tea Party Coalition.

Marvel Comics Editor-in-Chief Joe Quesada characterized the sign as inadvertent and as "something that we need to apologize for and own up to." Quesada explained that with a printing deadline looming, the comic's editor noticed that the protest group's signs on the original art were empty, and the editor "asked the letterer on the book to just fudge in some quick signs. The letterer in his rush ... looked on the 'net and started pulling slogans from actual signs", including a "Tea Bag" sign.

Following the issue's printing, Marvel staff "caught the mistake" and "spoke to the letterer, [who] was mortified at his mistake and was truly sorry as he had no political agenda." Quesada said Marvel "removed the sign from the art files so that it no longer appears in future reprints of the title or collections. So, while the crowd protesting has nothing to do with the villains in the story, we in no way meant to say they were associated with the Tea Party movement."

Transition of ownership regarding Star Wars
On December 21, 2012, Disney acquired Lucasfilm (and as a result, the rights to the Star Wars franchise; Skywalker Sound; and Industrial Light and Magic) as a subsidiary for the price of $4 billion. Lucasfilm and Star Wars in general were evaluated to decide upon how each area was to be approached.

After Dark Horse Comics lost the rights to create Star Wars comics, Marvel Comics gained the rights as a subsidiary in the area of expertise. The way the movies are being handled is still in flux with possible spin-offs in talks as well as the planned new trilogy. The decisions regarding the other sectors like games, books and animated media can be interpreted as anti-consumer.

With the elimination of the LucasArts developing arm, EA Games is being entrusted to make Star Wars video games in the future. The well-regarded animated TV series Star Wars: The Clone Wars was cancelled a few seasons from the end of its run, in order to shift the series' team to Star Wars Rebels, a new animated TV series created for Disney XD, set approximately five years before the events of Star Wars: Episode IV: A New Hope. This was done in the knowledge that many people loved the series and that it was quite profitable. They eventually revived Clone Wars for a final season.

Furthermore, book consumers were not given the option of two universes to read from, the first of which is what many of them have been reading about for over 40 years and have grown to love and the second of which is Disney's attempt to unify things under one controllable banner; as a result, this left fans of these books to only read new entries in the Unified Canon, and if they wish to see the continued growth of the Star Wars universe, the previous universe is now stuck in limbo.

On June 20, 2017, Phil Lord and Chris Miller, the directors of the film Solo: A Star Wars Story, left the production of the film five weeks before filming ended. Lord and Miller cited "creative differences" for their reason to part ways with the film. Many compared this to Edgar Wright stepping down as director of Ant-Man due to creative differences with Marvel Studios. Three months later, Episode IX director Colin Trevorrow stepped down as director under similar circumstances and was replaced with Star Wars: The Force Awakens director J. J. Abrams.

Sweatshop controversies 
In 1996, the New York-based National Labor Committee released a 12-page report that severely criticized Sears, Walmart, and The Walt Disney Company. Haitian contractors producing Mickey Mouse and Pocahontas pajamas for U.S. companies under license with the Walt Disney Corporation are in some cases paying workers as little as 15 gourdes (US$1) per day – 12 cents an hour – in clear violation of Haitian law, said the NLC. One factory owner testified that workers underperform because they cannot eat enough. Besides living on starvation wages, Haitian factory workers have to deal with sexual harassment and extraordinarily long working days. The report claimed it would take a seamstress 1,040 years to earn what then-CEO Michael Eisner earned in one day.

In 2012, the Institute for Global Labour and Human Rights released the report "Toys From Hell". It describes how workers at Dream International factory in Shenzen, China work 117-hour weeks in a filthy and unhealthy environment, where they are constantly screamed at by supervisors, and only earn $1.39 per hour. The report also describes workers as expected to lodge in dirty and overcrowded dormitories, where they are served below-par food. The Dream International factory was also considered to be a fire hazard.

Cruelty to animals 
Animal welfare groups have criticized Disney for their care of, and procedures for, wild animals at the Animal Kingdom theme park.

In 1989, Disney was charged with sixteen state and federal counts of animal cruelty relating to the abuse of vultures and other birds at its Discovery Island zoological park. According to investigators, employees shot at hawks, clubbed vultures to death with a stick, and destroyed nests and eggs. The park's supervisor supposedly sanctioned the abuses. Most striking were the deaths of fifteen vultures crammed into a tiny, overheated shed for days with limited food and water. Authorities also discovered 72 vultures confined in a windowless, airless shed, which legally speaking was only big enough for three vultures. Disney made a deal and in exchange for the dismissal of three federal charges, it pleaded guilty to a simple misdemeanor and agreed to pay a total of $95,000 to various institutions.

Disney has been criticized for using purebred dogs in movies such as 101 Dalmatians.  Animal rights groups claim movies with purebreds create an artificial demand for purebreds from people who may not be prepared or temperamentally suited for the animals, many of whom end up abandoned or surrendered to animal shelters or rescue groups.

Acquisition of 21st Century Fox by Disney

On December 14, 2017, Disney agreed to acquire 21st Century Fox's motion picture business, cable and direct satellite entertainment networks, that was completed on March 20, 2019. Under the terms of the agreement, Disney acquired the 20th Century Fox film and TV studios and related assets; cable and satellite networks including FX Networks, Fox Networks Group; Indian TV broadcasting company Star India; stakes in National Geographic Partners and Hulu, and other assets. Prior to the completion of the deal, Fox spun-off its news and broadcast businesses, including Fox News, Fox Business, FS1, FS2, Fox Deportes, and the Big Ten Network, the Fox Broadcasting Company, and MyNetworkTV into the newly-formed Fox Corporation.

This merger was subject to widespread criticism among critics, consumers, and businesses due to antitrust concerns. One of the biggest concerns is that unlike Disney's acquisition of Pixar, Marvel Entertainment, and Lucasfilm, the Disney/Fox deal was a horizontal integration (in which a company owns a direct competitor) in contrast to a vertical integration (in which two companies operate different stages for a specific finished product) like the mergers of AT&T-Time Warner and Comcast-NBCUniversal. Given Disney's already powerful box market shares, a combined Disney/Fox would give it a 39% theatrical market share and would strengthen Disney's already leveraging power over theater owners in its favor without regard to the negative effects on their businesses.

South Park controversy

The Jonas Brothers and Disney Channel are parodied in the South Park episode entitled "The Ring" and play a prominent role in the episode's plot. In a television column written before "The Ring" aired, Lisa de Moraes of The Washington Post suggested that creators Trey Parker and Matt Stone were using the Jonas Brothers in the 13th season debut as a means of improving the show's ratings; Comedy Central executives, however, insisted that the Jonas Brothers fans do not fit into South Park demographic of males aged from 18 to 49.

The Walt Disney Company, Disney Channel and the Mickey Mouse cartoon character are also prominently featured and spoofed in the episode; even when Mickey Mouse says callous things or physically assaults people, he follows up most statements with the character's trademark high-pitched "Ha ha!" laugh, which in context comes off like a nervous tic.

Reviewers and commentators have described "The Ring" as not just a parody of the Jonas Brothers, but also of the ethos of The Walt Disney Company. The episode portrays Disney as a corporation using the ruse of family-friendly morals to disguise their primary motive, which is profit; reviewers and articles said this point is further illustrated by the use of Mickey Mouse, a cartoon symbol for the wholesome Disney image, as a foul-mouthed, contemptuous, greedy, all-powerful and violent character.

Specifically, the episode targets Disney's marketing tactic of the band members pledging abstinence through purity rings, which the script suggests is used to subliminally sell sex to young girls, while simultaneously appeasing their parents' ethical standards and taking advantage of their fearful desire to protect their daughters, as Mickey had said.

Due to other speculation on the orientation and personal activities of the Jonas brothers, the episode continued to create a running gag on the effect of the Jonas brothers on young girls of the "tween" period, often provoking the image that they too would become like Mickey Mouse, in most unwanted characteristics. The episode further illustrates the greed of corporate culture by portraying Mickey as capitalizing on religion for profit, while secretly mocking it in a particularly cruel tone: "Even the Christians are too fucking stupid to figure out I'm selling sex to their daughters! I've made billions off of Christian ignorance for decades now! And do you know why? Because Christians are retarded! They believe in a talking dead guy!"

#DropDisney

In May 2021, conservative activist Christopher Rufo released internal documents from Disney. These included employee training material containing what Rufo said were racially inflammatory accusations, and telling employees to complete a white privilege checklist. In May 2022, Rufo released internal video calls from the company, including one in which Disney corporate president Karey Burke said that, "as the mother [of] one transgender child and one pansexual child," she supported having "many, many, many LGBTQIA characters in our stories" and wanted a minimum of 50 percent of characters to be LGBTQIA and racial minorities. Rufo publicly called for a boycott of Disney products and experiences.

Collusion to replace employees with H-1B holders
In January 2016, two former employees filed suit against Disney, HCL Technologies, and Cognizant, alleging the companies broke the law by colluding to bring in holders of H-1B visas to replace American workers. In October 2016, federal Judge Gregory A. Presnell of the United States District Court in Orlando dismissed the lawsuits, stating: "none of the allegedly false statements put at issue in the complaint are adequate".

Funding of Florida's Parental Rights in Education Act

In late February 2022 it was reported that Disney donated an estimated $200,000 to sponsors and cosponsors of Florida's Parental Rights in Education Act (known by its critics as the Don't Say Gay law). On March 7, 2022, Disney CEO Bob Chapek said that the company would not take a public stance on the bill, focusing instead on effecting change through its content. After criticism of their stance by those affiliated with Disney, including the company's employees, Disney affirmed that they would challenge the bill. In a possible act of retaliation, Florida Governor Ron DeSantis and Florida lawmakers threatened to repeal the 1967 Reedy Creek Improvement Act, which established the area surrounding the Walt Disney World Resort, the Reedy Creek Improvement District, as its own city. On April 22, 2022, DeSantis signed a bill to dissolve the Reedy Creek Improvement District by June 2023.

Copyright extension
Since 1990, The Walt Disney Company has lobbied for copyright extension. The Copyright Term Extension Act delayed the entry into the public domain of the earliest Mickey Mouse movies, leading detractors to nickname it "The Mickey Mouse Protection Act". Opponents of the legislation consider it to be corporate welfare and have tried (but failed) to have it declared unconstitutional, claiming that such an act is not "necessary and proper" to accomplishing the Constitution's stated purpose of "promot[ing] the progress of science and useful arts". They argue that, since most works bring the majority of their profits during the first few years after publication, extending the terms of copyrights provides little economic incentive except to a few owners of wildly-successful franchises.

Miscellaneous criticisms and complaints 

 In November 2020, Alan Dean Foster, an author who wrote several novelizations of Star Wars, said that Disney was refusing to pay royalties on the novels, or even recognize that contractual obligations existed. Disney was censured by the president of the Science Fiction and Fantasy Writers of America, Mary Robinette Kowal, as well as other prominent authors.
 Gravity Falls creator Alex Hirsch has been a vocal critic of many Disney practices, with multiple jokes at Disney's expense appearing in the Netflix Animation series Inside Job for which Hirsch served as executive producer. Hirsch's criticisms include:
 the censorship and removal of LGBTQ+ content in order to appeal to conservative audience
 insufficient quality care for Disney merchandise
 the small amount of merchandise for various Disney Television Animation productions, compared to other Disney franchises such as the Disney Princesses
 the lack of creative freedom in Disney's animation studios, especially frequent "ridiculous"  notes from Disney's Standards and Practices department during the production of Gravity Falls. 
 In August 2014, Disney and Disney English were sued in an American court for subjecting workers, young children and infants to highly polluted air in classrooms, resulting in illness. Disney chose to settle out of court.
 Religious welfare groups such as the Catholic League have spoken out against the release of material which they and others found offensive, including vehement protests of the Miramax Films features Priest (1994) and Dogma (1999). Disney pushed back Dogma release date due to the controversy surrounding the movie, and eventually sold the distribution rights to Lions Gate Films.  The ABC show Nothing Sacred, about a Jesuit priest, a book called Growing Up Gay (published by Disney-owned Hyperion Press), the (unofficial) annual Gay and Lesbian Days at Disney theme parks, and similar issues spurred boycotts of Disney and its advertisers by the Catholic League, the Assemblies of God, and other conservative Christian groups.
 Disney has been accused of human rights violations regarding the working conditions in factories that produce their merchandise.
 The Southern Baptist Convention (SBC) and the American Family Association voted to boycott Disney over opposition to Disney offering domestic partnership benefits to gay employees and over opposition to the ABC show Ellen, in which the show's star, Ellen DeGeneres, came out as lesbian. Both boycotts were withdrawn in 2005.
 An environmental management plan for a zone of Great Guana Cay, in the Abaco Islands, criticized Disney for poor management of a  tract of the island. Disney partially developed but then abandoned the place, which was to have been a cruise ship resort called Treasure Island. The report, by the University of Miami and the College of the Bahamas, blames Disney for leaving hazardous materials, electrical transformers, and fuel tanks, as well as introducing invasive alien plants and insects that threaten the island's natural flora and fauna.
 Disney Publishing Worldwide supported the widely criticized Stop Online Piracy Act (SOPA).

See also 

 Criticism of ESPN
 Incidents at Disney Parks
 Walt Disney: Hollywood's Dark Prince

References

Disney
The Walt Disney Company
 
LGBT-related controversies in the United States
Race-related controversies
Animation controversies
Mass media and entertainment controversies
Mass media-related controversies in the United States